The Lost Masters is the name given to an album project to release unheard, rare and extended remixes of songs by the British pop group Bucks Fizz.  Two albums were originally released: The Lost Masters in 2006, and The Lost Masters 2 - The Final Cut in 2008.  A third single-disc volume was released in April 2012 as a double-pack which included a re-release of the group's 1986 album Writing on the Wall.  Finally, The Best of The Lost Masters, a 25-track compilation was released in April 2013, which also included a number of previously unreleased mixes.

Background
The first album, The Lost Masters, was released in 2006 to coincide with the group's 25th anniversary, while The Lost Masters 2 - The Final Cut was released in 2008.  Both albums consist of two CDs, and were released by Sony Music in association with Fat Dog Productions, led by Dean Murphy and fan producer Kevin Newell.

After working on the second edition, the producers found some more unreleased tracks.  These were released as a third volume, together with a re-release of the group's final studio album Writing on the Wall.  The 'new' tracks were solo recordings, three by Bobby G, one by Cheryl Baker, and one by Shelley Preston; all originally recorded in 1988.  The live tracks were outtakes from the Live at the Fairfield Hall, Croydon album, which had been released in 1991.  Unlike the first two, this album was released on Polydor Records through Universal Music.

In 2013, a final compilation was released: The Best of The Lost Masters and More!.  This collected the best mixes from the first two albums, alongside a number of newly created or previously unreleased mixes.  Producer Dean Murphy announced his retirement at the end of 2012, making this the last release of the series.  This collection, which was released as a digital download only, was reviewed in the 1980s-themed magazine Classic Pop.  In a 4-star review, journalist Mark Frith commended the album saying that "Great pop music is timeless and Bucks Fizz were much more than just 'that band that won Eurovision'".  He singled out I Hear Talk and Heart of Stone as being particular highlights.

The Lost Masters

Track listing
CD 1
Breaking Me Up (extended version) (6.58)writers: Andy Hill / Frank Musker, producer: Hill
Easy Love (Blazer's version) (3.41)writers: Hill / Nichola Martin, producer: Hill
If Paradise is Half as Nice (original version) (3.31)writers: Lucio Battisti / Jack Fishman, producer: Hill
Invisible (early version) (4.31)writers: Hill / Mike Batt, producer: Hill
I Love Music (3.59)writers: Gamble & Huff), producer: Simon Harris
Oh Suzanne (7" unreleased version) (4.48)writers: Hill / Warren Bacall, producer: Hill
I Can't Live Without Love (1986 version) (5.26)writers: Mary Unobsky / Daniel Ironstone / David Harvey, producer: Bobby G / Trevor Vallis
What's One Lonely Woman (Cheryl solo track) (4.15)writers: Hill / Don Black, producer: Hill
Thief in the Night (Extended version) (6.27) writers: Hill / Bacall, producer: Brian Tench
These Boots are Made for Walking (Shelley solo track) (3.44)writers: Lee Hazlewood, producer: Pete Woodroofe / Dean Murphy
Skin on Skin (Cheryl solo track) (3.54)writer: Hill, producer: Hill
Breaking and Entering (demo) (3.20)writers: Hill / Pete Sinfield,  producer: Hill
You and Your Heart so Blue (So Blue mix) (4.38)writers: Hill / Sinfield, producer: Hill / Murphy
If You're Right (original version) (3.13)writers: Hill / Sinfield, producer: Hill
Young Hearts (unreleased version) (4.05)writer: Hill, producer: Nick Tauber
She Cries (original version) (4.08)writer: Nik Kershaw, producer: Pip Williams / Murphy

CD 2
Oh Suzanne (extended version) (6.39)writers: Hill / Bacall, producer: Hill
Indebted to You (dead-end version) (4.10)writers: Hill / Bacall, producer: Hill
I'd Like to Say I Love You (alternate take) (4.12)writer: Warren Harry, producer: Hill
My Camera Never Lies (2006 'Good Eyes' remix) (4.27)writers: Hill / Martin, producer: Hill / Murphy / Kevin Newell
Invisible (extended version) (6.31)writers: Hill / Batt, producer: Hill
Cold War (extended version) (5.57)writer: Dominic Bugatti, producer: Tench
Now Those Days Are Gone (2006) (3.16)writers: Hill / Martin, producer: Hill / Murphy
If You're Right (re-recorded version) (3.15)writers: Hill / Sinfield, producer: Hill / Murphy
Every Dream Has Broken (4.44)writer: Hill, producer: Williams / Murphy
New Beginning (Mamba Seyra) (original version) (4.01)writers: Mike Myers / Tony Gibber, producer: Hill / Myers
I Can't Live Without Love (1987 version) (4.28)writers: Unobsky / Ironstone / Harvey, producer: G / Tench
Tears on the Ballroom Floor (long version) (4.39)writers: Anthony Phillips / Roy Hill, producer: Tench
Move Over (I'm Driving) (4.02)writer: Hill, producer: Murphy
Young Hearts (Shelley's mix) (4.24)writer: Hill, producer: Tauber
You and Your Heart So Blue (a cappella version) (3.22)writers: Hill / Sinfield, producer: Hill

Personnel
Dean Murphy - Album producer
Kevin Newell - Executive producer
Kevin Newell and Andy Popplewell - EQ and Line production
Dean Murphy, Kevin Newell and Simon Murphy - Remasters
Remastered at SRT Studios, St Ives, Cambridge

The Lost Masters 2 - The Final Cut

Track listing
CD 1
Talking in Your Sleep (full unedited version) (4.58)writers: Marinos / Palmer / Skill / Canler / Solley, producer: Andy Hill
Breaking Me Up (7" version) (4.36)writers: Hill / Frank Musker, producer: Hill
Rules of the Game (dead-end version) (3.44)writer: Warren Bacall, producer: Hill / Brian Tench
Piece of the Action (demo) (3.22)writer: Hill, producer: Hill
My Camera Never Lies (alternate mix) (4.13)writers: Hill / Nichola Martin, producer: Hill
Don't Think You're Foolin' Me (demo) (3.23)writer: Bobby G, producer: G
I'd Like to Say I Love You (alternate mix) (3.20)writer: Warren Harry, producer: Hill
Magical (the rock mix) (4.38)writers: Meat Loaf / John Parr, producer: Hill
Golden Days (extended version) (7.58)writers: Terry Britten, producer: Britten / Dean Murphy
If You Can't Stand the Heat (early mix) (3.26)writers: Hill / Ian Bairnson, producer: Hill
You and Your Heart so Blue (Andy Hill's Mauritus mix) (3.56)writers: Hill / Pete Sinfield, producer: Hill
The Right Situation (early mix) (3.02)writer: Hill, producer: Hill
Tears on the Ballroom Floor (the original idea) (4.13)writers: Anthony Phillips / Roy Hill, producer: Tench / Murphy
Every Dream Has Broken (early mix) (8.05)writer: Pip Williams, producer: Murphy
 
CD 2 
"Another Night" (Alternate version) (3.40) Writer: Hill,  Producer: Hill
"Easy Love" (European remix) (4.48) Writer: Hill / Martin,  Producer: Hill
"Putting the Heat On" (3.14) Writer: G, Producer: G
"Run for Your Life" (2008 remix) (6.50) Writers: Hill / Bairnson,  Producer: Hill / Murphy
"One of Those Nights" (Demo) (2.54) Writers: Steve Glen / Mike Burns / Dave Most,  Producer: Hill
"Invisible" (Early edit) (3.57) Writer: Mike Batt,  Producer: Hill
"You Love Love" (TV version) (3.38) Writer: Andy Sells,  Producer: Hill
"Cold War" (7" version) (3.37) Writer: Dominic Bugatti, Producer: Tench
"Getting Kinda Lonely" (Unedited version) (6.18) Writer: Mike Burns,  Producer: Hill
"Because of Susan" (3.07) Writer: G, Producer: G
"Indebted to You" (Alternate version) (5.01) Writers: Hill / Bacall,  Producer: Hill
"The Land of Make Believe" (Extended remix) (6.39) Writers: Hill / Sinfield,  Producer: Hill / Murphy
"Let's Get Wet" (Cheryl Baker lead vocal) (4.05) Writers: Glen / Burns,  Producer: Glen
"Every Dream Has Broken" (Sugar Cube Vs Bucks Fizz remix) (8.39) Writer: Williams,  Producer:Murphy / Darren Fox
This album features a hidden track - a demo of "Now Those Days Are Gone" by producer Andy Hill. This track features an expletive, necessitating the album to carry a Parental Advisory sticker.

Personnel
Dean Murphy - Album producer
Kevin Newell and Paul Kearsey - Executive producers
Simon Murphy and Kevin Newell - Masters
Neil Martin - for Sony BMG
Andy Hayes - Artwork

The Lost Masters 3
Bonus disc included with 2012 re-issue of Writing On the Wall

Track listing
 "Love the One You're With" (Alternate mix) 3:27 Writer: Stephen Stills 
 "Keep Each Other Warm" (The original idea) 5:21 Writers: Andy Hill / Pete Sinfield 
 "Love in a World Gone Mad" (Shelley Preston version) 3:40 Writers: Sinfield / Billy Livesey 
 "Big Deal" (1986 7") 3:35  Writer: Bobby G 
 "I Want to Stay" (Unedited version) 4:12 Writer: G 
 "What's One Lonely Woman" (Laid back mix 2011) 3:56 Writer: Don Black 
 "The Company You Keep" (Demo) 3:36  Writers: G / Steve Glen / Mike Burns 
 "Easy Trouble" (Cheryl Baker solo) 4:12  Writers: Glen / Burns 
 "One Heart" (Bobby G solo) 4:13 Writers: Glen / Burns / G 
 "I Should Have Been Strong" (Bobby G solo) 3:21 Writers: Glen / Burns / G 
 "Paper Hearts" (Shelley Preston solo) 4:10 Writers: Glen / Burns 
 "Innocent" (Bobby G solo) 3:36 Writers: Glen / Burns / G 
 "Big Deal" (1986 extended version) 5:00 Writer: G 
 "Live Motown Medley" 8:43 Writers: Holland / Dozier / Holland / Robinson / Gordy / West / Hutch / Davis 
 "Live Rolling Stones Medley" 6:56 Writers: Mick Jagger / Keith Richards 
"Soul Motion" (2011 extended version) 7:41 Writers: Hill / Gary Bell

Personnel
Dean Murphy and Kevin Newell - Producers
Phil Bennett and Martin Blofield - Executive associates
Alex Fryer - Associate
Kevin Newell and Warwick Pilmer - Masters

The Best of The Lost Masters and More!

Track listing
 "Breaking Me Up" (Extended Version)  6:58Taken from The Lost Masters  
 "Oh Suzanne" (Extended Version)  6:37 Taken from The Lost Masters  
 "When We Were at War" (2012 Mix)  5:46  Previously unreleased
 "Invisible" (Extended Version)  6:29 Taken from The Lost Masters  
 "Every Dream Has Broken" (2010 Extended Version)  8:14  Previously unreleased
 "Cold War" (Extended Version)  5:55   Taken from  The Lost Masters
 "Young Hearts" (Alternate Mix)  4:01  Previously unreleased 
 "One of Those Nights" (Extended Version)  6:36 Previously unreleased
 "Piece of the Action" (Demo)  3:23   Taken from The Lost Masters 2
 "You and Your Heart So Blue" (Andy Hill Mauritus Mix)  3:54 Previously unreleased
 "Easy Love" (European Version)  4:47  Taken from  The Lost Masters 2
 "Big Deal" (1984 Extended Version)  6:01  Previously unreleased on CD
 "Another Night" (Alternate Version)  3:39   Taken from The Lost Masters 2
 "Heart of Stone" (Cheryl Lead Extended Version)  6:30 Previously unreleased
 "Tears on the Ballroom Floor" (Long Version)  4:37 Taken from The Lost Masters
 "Indebted to You" (Jay Aston Lead Vocal)  5:00  Taken from The Lost Masters 2
 "I Hear Talk" (Extra Talk Mix)  5:00  Previously unreleased
 "The Land of Make Believe" (Chris Paul Remix)  4:14  Previously unreleased on CD 
 "She Cries" (Original Version)  4:07    Taken from The Lost Masters
 "Thief in the Night" (Extended Version)  6:25    Taken from The Lost Masters
 "One of Those Nights" (2012 7" Mix)  4:21   Previously unreleased
 "I'd Like to Say I Love You" (Alternate Mix)  3:18   Taken from The Lost Masters 2
 "Talking in Your Sleep" (Full Unedited Version)  4:56   Taken from The Lost Masters 2
 "Every Dream Has Broken" (Original Sugar Cube Remix)  4:05 Previously unreleased  
 "Making Your Mind Up" (Acapella)  2:00    Previously unreleased

References

Bucks Fizz albums
2006 compilation albums
2008 compilation albums
Compilation album series